The Apalachee River is a distributary river in Baldwin County, Alabama that forms part of the Mobile-Tensaw River Delta. Apalachee comes from the Hitchiti word apalahchi, which means "on the other side".

See also
List of Alabama rivers

References

Rivers of Baldwin County, Alabama
Rivers of Alabama
Tributaries of Mobile Bay
Alabama placenames of Native American origin